Rahimabad-e Agah (also Romanized as Raḩīmābād-e Āgāh; also known as Raḩīmābād) is a village in Eslamiyeh Rural District, in the Central District of Rafsanjan County, Kerman Province, Iran. At the 2006 census, its population was 287, in 67 families.

References 

Populated places in Rafsanjan County